St. Thomas' Theological College is the national seminary of the Church of Pakistan, part of the Anglican communion. It was established in 1987.

Samuel Azariah, the former Moderator and Primate of the Church of Pakistan, serves as the chairman of the seminary.

References

Anglican seminaries and theological colleges
Church of Pakistan
Education in Karachi
Educational institutions established in 1987
1987 establishments in Pakistan
Anglican schools in Pakistan